Grant Stafford (born 27 May 1971) is a former tennis player from South Africa.

Turning professional in 1990, Stafford won five doubles titles during his career. The right-hander reached his career-high singles ranking on the ATP Tour of World No. 53 in January 1994.

Junior Grand Slam finals

Doubles: 1 (1 title)

ATP career finals

Singles: 3 (3 runner-ups)

Doubles: 6 (5 titles, 1 runner-up)

ATP Challenger and ITF Futures Finals

Singles: 5 (3–2)

Doubles: 12 (6–6)

Performance timelines

Singles

Doubles

External links
 
 
 

1971 births
Living people
South African people of British descent
Tennis players from Johannesburg
South African male tennis players
South African people of English descent
US Open (tennis) junior champions
White South African people
Grand Slam (tennis) champions in boys' doubles
African Games medalists in tennis
African Games gold medalists for South Africa
Competitors at the 1995 All-Africa Games